The Emory S. Land-class submarine tender is a class of three submarine tenders in the United States Navy and Military Sealift Command.  is the lead ship in the class, the others are  and . McKee was the first ship in the class to be decommissioned. The Emory S. Land class is set to be replaced by 2 ships of the AS(X) class.

Design
The Emory S. Land-class is identical to the preceding L. Y. Spear-class. The ships were specifically designed to service nuclear-powered attack submarines. They feature 53 specialized workshops on 13 decks on board. Four submarines can be serviced simultaneously. The ships are equipped with two 40 ton bow anchors and one 20 ton stern anchor, two 60 ton cranes and two 7 ton cranes. All ships have a helicopter landing pad aft, although no hangar.

Ships in class 
Italics indicate estimated dates

References

 

 
Naval ships of the United States
Ships built by Lockheed Shipbuilding and Construction Company